The Maffet Ledger is a late 19th-century compilation of Cheyenne artwork. The ledger was compiled by newspaper owner George Maffet, and contains 105 drawings. The ledger is in the collection of the Metropolitan Museum of Art.

Description 
The Maffet Ledger contains 105 drawings attributed to around 22 different Cheyenne authors. Most of the drawings depict battle scenes between the Cheyenne, other plains tribes, and the United States Army. The compiler of the ledger, George West Maffet Sr., was an editor for The Cheyenne Transporter, a journal published in Oklahoma.

One notable contributor to the ledger was Howling Wolf.

Gallery

See also
Ledger art

References 

Collection of the Metropolitan Museum of Art
1874 books